Established in 1967, the British Vehicle Rental & Leasing Association (BVRLA) is the UK trade body for companies engaged in vehicle rental, leasing and fleet management.
On behalf of 980+ member organisations, the BVRLA works with governments, public sector agencies, industry associations, consumer groups and other stakeholders across a wide range of road transport, environmental, taxation, technology and finance-related issues.

BVRLA members are responsible for a combined fleet of almost five million cars, vans and trucks on UK roads, or 1-in-8 cars, 1-in-5 vans and 1-in-5 trucks. The vehicle rental and leasing industry supports over 465,000 jobs, adds £7.6bn in tax revenues and contributes £49bn to the UK economy each year.

It seeks to look after the interests of, and sets standards for operational quality for, both the contract hire and leasing sectors and the daily hire (car rental) sectors. The BVRLA represents both the business contract hire and personal contract purchase industry. The BVRLA's activities also include lobbying government in respect of any fiscal matter which may affect the industry, and shaping policy and regulation changes. This involves developing policy areas across the wide range of industry issues, lobbying decision-makers in the UK and in Europe.

Organisation

The association's Chief Executive is Gerry Keaney, who joined in 2013. Keaney succeeded John Lewis as Chief Executive, who held the position for 13 years before stepping down.

Members
As of 1 January 2019, the BVRLA had more than 980 members.

Legal and Policy work
The BVRLA is committed to working with public sector agencies, industry associations and key business influencers on key road transport, taxation and finance-related issues.

In 2014, it argued that the DVLA's plans to move driver records online would not make renting a car "quicker or cheaper than the current system of checking the paper driver licence counterpart".

In 2016, the BVRLA called on the government to tackle the challenges of the UK’s 'grey fleet', following the publication of a new report that showed the true cost of employees using their own cars for work purposes.

Consumer advice

The association regulates the industry through a regular series of quality assurance inspections and mandatory codes of conducts. It also offers a free conciliation service to help resolve disputes they may have been experienced with member companies.

References 

Road transport in the United Kingdom
Transport advocacy groups of the United Kingdom
1967 establishments in the United Kingdom
Organizations established in 1967